Yoriko (written: 頼子, 順子, 依子 or より子) is a feminine Japanese given name. Notable people with the name include:

, Japanese singer-songwriter
, Japanese actress
, Japanese politician
, Japanese judoka
, Japanese politician
, Japanese television announcer
, Japanese taekwondo practitioner
, Japanese javelin thrower
, Japanese writer

Fictional characters
, a character in the manga series Tachibanakan To Lie Angle
, a character in the anime series Just Because!
, a character in the manga series Yuyushiki
, a character in the manga series You're Under Arrest
, a character in the light novel series Lance N' Masques
, a character in the light novel series Haiyore! Nyaruko-san
, a character in the video game series Arcana Heart
, a character from the PlayStation 2 horror video game, Forbidden Siren

Japanese feminine given names